St Senan's, Kilkee are a Gaelic Athletic Association (GAA) club in Kilkee, County Clare, Ireland. The club participates in games organized by the Clare County Board. It is primarily a Gaelic football club.

As part of the 2016 Football Review Agreement, a pathway was left open for any amalgamations that wished to enter the senior championship. Two intermediate clubs (Naomh Eoin and O'Curry's) from the Loop Head Peninsula took up this opportunity for 2019 and competed together as West Clare. After West Clare's relative success in 2019, their near neighbours Kilkee will join them under the name Western Gaels for 2020. Once again amalgamations will be exempt from potential relegation.

Major honours
 Munster Senior Club Football Championship Runners-Up: 1989, 1992, 2003, 2005
 Clare Senior Football Championship (8): 1926, 1928, 1942, 1984, 1989, 1992, 2003, 2005
 Clare Senior Club Hurling Championship Runners-Up: 1972
 Clare Football League Div. 1 (Cusack Cup) (7): 1946, 1977, 1980, 1989, 1993, 1996, 1999
 Clare Intermediate Football Championship (3): 1938, 1940 (as Blackweir), 1974
 Clare Junior A Football Championship (5): 1926, 1970, 1974, 1990, 1996
 Clare Under-21 A Football Championship (5): 1976, 1979, 1989, 1992, 1993

References

External references

Gaelic games clubs in County Clare
Gaelic football clubs in County Clare
Kilkee